T2 was a seagoing torpedo boat operated by the Yugoslav Royal Navy between 1921 and 1939, after being commissioned in August 1914 and spending World War I in Austro-Hungarian Navy service. Originally 77 T, she was a 250t-class torpedo boat, a class built to address the expectation that the Strait of Otranto, where the Adriatic Sea meets the Ionian Sea, would be blockaded by hostile forces during a future conflict. She saw active service during World War I, performing convoy, patrol, escort, minesweeping and minelaying tasks, anti-submarine operations, and shore bombardment missions. In 1917 the suffixes of all Austro-Hungarian torpedo boats were removed, and thereafter she was referred to as 77.

Following Austria-Hungary's defeat in 1918, 77 was allocated to the Navy of the Kingdom of Serbs, Croats and Slovenes, which later became the Yugoslav Royal Navy, and was renamed T2. At the time, she and seven other 250t-class boats were the only modern sea-going vessels of the fledgling maritime force. During the interwar period, T2 and the rest of the Navy were involved in training exercises and cruises to friendly ports, but activity was limited by reduced naval budgets. She was scrapped in 1939.

Background
In 1910, the Austria-Hungary Naval Technical Committee initiated the design and development of a  coastal torpedo boat, specifying that it should be capable of sustaining  for 10 hours. This specification was based an expectation that the Strait of Otranto, where the Adriatic Sea meets the Ionian Sea, would be blockaded by hostile forces during a future conflict. In such circumstances, there would be a need for a torpedo boat that could sail from the Austro-Hungarian Navy base at the Bocche di Cattaro (Bay of Kotor) to the Strait during the night, locate and attack blockading ships and return to port before morning. Steam turbine power was selected for propulsion, as diesels with the necessary power were not available, and the Austro-Hungarian Navy did not have the practical experience to run turbo-electric boats. Stabilimento Tecnico Triestino (STT) of Triest was selected for the contract to build eight vessels, the T group, ahead of one other tenderer. The T-group designation signified that they were built at Triest, and 77 T was the fourth boat of the T-group to be fully completed.

Description and construction
The crew consisted of 39 officers and enlisted men. The boats were powered by two Parsons steam turbines driving two propellers, using steam generated by two Yarrow water-tube boilers, one of which burned fuel oil and the other coal. The T-group had one funnel rather than the two funnels of the later F and M groups of the class. Due to inadequate funding, 77 T and the rest of the 250t class were essentially coastal vessels, despite the original intention that they would be used for "high seas" operations. They were the first small Austro-Hungarian Navy boats to use turbines, and this contributed to ongoing problems with them.

The boats were originally to be armed with three Škoda  L/30 guns, and three  torpedo tubes, but this was changed to two of the same guns and four torpedo tubes before the first boat was completed, in order to standardise the armament with the following F-group. They could also carry 10–12 naval mines. The fourth of its class to be completed, 77 T was laid down on 24 August 1913, launched on 30 January 1914 and completed on 11 August 1914. Later that year, one  machine gun was added.

Career

World War I
At the outbreak of World War I on 28 July 1914, 77 T was part of the 1st Torpedo Group of the 3rd Torpedo Craft Division of the Austro-Hungarian 1st Torpedo Craft Flotilla, which was led by the scout cruiser  commanded by Linienschiffskapitän (Captain) Heinrich Seitz, and supported by the mother ship Gäa. The concept of operation for the 250t-class boats was that they would sail in a flotilla at the rear of a cruising battle formation, and were to intervene in fighting only if the battleships around which the formation was established were disabled, or in order to attack damaged enemy battleships. When a torpedo attack was ordered, it was to be led by a scout cruiser, supported by two destroyers to repel any enemy torpedo boats. A group of four to six torpedo boats would deliver the attack under the direction of the flotilla commander.

During the war, 77 T was used for convoy, patrol, escort and minesweeping tasks, anti-submarine operations, and shore bombardment missions. In early September 1914, intelligence was received by the Austro-Hungarian command that an Italian volunteer corps were planning to land on the Dalmatian or Istrian coast, and the 1st Torpedo Flotilla was involved fruitless patrolling off Sebenico and Zara between 19 and 24 September. It appears that this was French disinformation intended to keep the Austro-Hungarian fleet engaged while they conducted operations in the southern Adriatic. On the evening of 3 November, the 1st Torpedo Flotilla left Sebenico to make a night torpedo attack on the French fleet, which had begun its seventh raid on the Adriatic on 31 October, but by the time they reached the threatened areas, the French had withdrawn as they were running low on coal.

Italy declared war on Austria-Hungary on the afternoon of 23 May 1915, and almost the entire Austro-Hungarian fleet left Pola soon after to deliver an immediate response against Italian cities and towns along the Adriatic coast, aiming to interdict land and sea transport between southern Italy and the northern regions of that country which were expected to be a theatre of land operations. The fleet split into six groups with a range of targets up and down the coast. On 24 May 1915, 77 T and seven other 250t-class boats participated in the Bombardment of Ancona, which involved shelling various Italian shore-based targets, with 77 T involved in the operation against Ancona itself. On 23 July, 77 T and another 250t-class boat participated in another shore bombardment mission led by the scout cruiser  against Ortona on the central Adriatic coast of Italy.

In late November 1915, the Austro-Hungarian fleet deployed a force from its main fleet base at Pola to Cattaro in the southern Adriatic; this force included six of the eight T-group torpedo boats. This force was tasked to maintain a permanent patrol of the Albanian coastline and interdict any troop transports crossing from Italy. After an attack on Durazzo in Albania on 30 December in which two Austro-Hungarian destroyers were sunk after straying out of a cleared lane through a minefield, 77 T and four other 250t-class boats were sent south with Novara in order to strengthen morale and try to prevent the transfer of the captured crew of one of the destroyers to Italy. No Italian ships were encountered, and the group returned to the Bocche the following day.

On 22 February 1916, 77 T and two other 250t-class boats, accompanied by a Kaiman-class torpedo boat, laid a minefield outside Antivari harbour. With Austro-Hungarian forces closing on Durazzo from the land, the Allies began to evacuate by sea, and Austro-Hungarian naval forces were sent to attempt to interdict. On 24 February, Helgoland, four destroyers, 77 T and five other 250t-class boats were sent to intercept four Italian destroyers covering the evacuation, but were unable to locate them. Orjen sank the British drifter Beneficent, but once the alarm had been raised, the Austro-Hungarian force withdrew. In 1917, one of 77 T'''s 66 mm guns was placed on an anti-aircraft mount. On 21 May 1917, the suffix of all Austro-Hungarian torpedo boats was removed, and thereafter they were referred to only by the numeral. On 23 September 1917, 77 and another 250t-class boat were laying a minefield off Grado in the northern Adriatic when they had a brief encounter with a Royal Italian Navy MAS motor torpedo boat.

By 1918, the Allies had strengthened their ongoing blockade on the Strait of Otranto, as foreseen by the Austro-Hungarian Navy. As a result, it was becoming more difficult for the German and Austro-Hungarian U-boats to get through the strait and into the Mediterranean Sea. In response to these blockades, the new commander of the Austro-Hungarian Navy, Konteradmiral Miklós Horthy, decided to launch an attack on the Allied defenders with battleships, scout cruisers, and destroyers. About 03:15 on 10 June, while returning from an uneventful patrol off the Dalmatian coast, two Italian MAS boats, MAS 15 and MAS 21, spotted the smoke from the Austro-Hungarian ships. Both boats successfully penetrated the escort screen and split to engage the dreadnoughts individually. MAS 21 attacked Tegetthoff, but her torpedoes missed. Under the command of Luigi Rizzo, MAS 15 fired two torpedoes at 03:25, both of which hit Szent István. Both boats evaded pursuit. The torpedo hits on Szent István were abreast her boiler rooms, which flooded, knocking out power to the pumps. Szent István capsized less than three hours after being torpedoed. This disaster practically ended Austro-Hungarian fleet operations in the Adriatic for the remaining months of the war.

Interwar period
The Austro-Hungarian Empire sued for peace in November 1918, and 77 survived the war intact. In 1920, under the terms of the previous year's Treaty of Saint-Germain-en-Laye which officially ended the participation of rump Austria in World War I, she was allocated to the Kingdom of Serbs, Croats and Slovenes (later Yugoslavia). Along with three other 250t-class T-group boats, 76, 78 and 79, and four 250t-class F-group boats, she served with the Yugoslav Royal Navy (KM; Краљевска морнарица). Taken over in March 1921, in KM service, 77 was renamed T2. When the Navy was formed, she and the other seven 250t-class boats were the only modern sea-going vessels in the KM. In 1925, exercises were conducted off the Dalmatian coast, involving the majority of the Navy. The ships and crews made a very good impression on the British while visiting Malta. In 1932, the British naval attaché reported that Yugoslav ships engaged in few exercises, manoeuvres or gunnery training due to reduced budgets. In 1939, T2'' was stricken from the naval register due to her age and scrapped soon after.

See also
List of ships of the Royal Yugoslav Navy

Notes

Footnotes

References

 
 
 

 
 
 
 
 
 
 
 
 
 
 
 
 
 

Torpedo boats of the Austro-Hungarian Navy
Torpedo boats of the Royal Yugoslav Navy
World War I torpedo boats of Austria-Hungary
1914 ships
Ships built in Trieste